The 1970 Boston Patriots season was the franchise's first season in the National Football League and eleventh overall. They ended the season with a record of two wins and twelve losses, fifth (last) in the AFC East Division.

This was the final season as the “Boston” Patriots, as they moved southwest to Foxborough, Massachusetts the next season and became the “New England” Patriots. Their final season as Boston did not go as planned, as the Patriots struggled all season and finished 2–12, the worst record in the NFL. Home games in 1970 were played at Harvard Stadium.

After taking the season opener at home from the Miami Dolphins, Boston lost nine in a row before beating the Buffalo Bills on the road. The season concluded with an embarrassing 45–7 loss to the Bengals in Cincinnati. Head coach Clive Rush quit midway through the season because of medical reasons. His replacement, offensive backfield coach John Mazur, did not do much better of a job, but he continued as head coach the next season.

Despite being a Super Bowl quarterback, no NFL team made contact with 32-year-old Joe Kapp until after the start of the regular season. Prior to the  season, the Minnesota Vikings had exercised the option clause of his contract, so Kapp had played the entire season without a new contract. It was unusual for teams to use the team's option and not to offer a new contract prior to a season. This dispute made him a free agent for the 1970 season, by the NFL's own rules.  The Patriots signed him on October 2 to a four-year contract, making him the highest paid player in the league. The Patriots had to give up strong safety John Charles and a first-round draft pick in 1972 (used to select Stanford linebacker Jeff Siemon).  Kapp's first appearance was on October 11 at Kansas City, relieving starter Mike Taliaferro in the third quarter of a 23–10 loss to the team which manhandled Kapp and the Vikings in the Super Bowl nine months prior.

The Vikings paid Kapp back in full in week 13, rolling to a 35–14 victory in the Patriots' final game at Harvard and in Boston prior to the move to Foxborough. 

The Patriots' poor record gave them the first overall selection in the 1971 NFL Draft. They took quarterback Jim Plunkett, the Heisman Trophy winner from Stanford, upset winner of the Rose Bowl.

Offseason

NFL draft

Staff

Roster

Regular season

Schedule

Standings

References

New England Patriots seasons
Boston Patriots
Patriots
Boston Patriots